Anthidium soni is a species of bee in the family Megachilidae, the leaf-cutter, carder, or mason bees.

Synonyms
Synonyms for this species include:
Anthidium soni kumenense Mavromoustakis, 1937

Distribution
Africa

References

soni
Insects described in 1937